Eshwara Temple is a Hindu temple in Kengeri, Bangalore, dedicated to the Lord Shiva. Dates back to the Chola king Rajendra Chola's Period (1050 AD).

It is one of Chola Era Temples in Bangalore.

Eshwara Temple is called as Prasanna Someswara Temple and is located near to Kote  Anjaneya Swamy Temple in Kengeri.

Notes 

11th-century Hindu temples
Chola architecture
Hindu temples in Bangalore